Lice 3: Triple Fat Lice is the third EP released by American rappers Aesop Rock and Homeboy Sandman. Jeremy Fish designed the EP's cover art, as well as the cover art for both Lice and Lice Two: Still Buggin'. The cover art resembles that of the album Sounds of Silence by Simon & Garfunkel.

Track listing

References 

2017 EPs
Aesop Rock albums
Homeboy Sandman albums